Corado is a surname. Notable people with the surname include:

Gastón Corado (born 1989), Argentine footballer 
María Gabriela Rivera Corado (born 2001), Guatemalan tennis player
Ruby Corado, Salvadoran LGBT activist

See also
 Corrado (disambiguation)